Robert Galloway and Bradley Klahn were the defending champions but chose not to defend their title.

Alex Lawson and Marc Polmans won the title after defeating Hans Hach Verdugo and Dennis Novikov 6–4, 3–6, [10–7] in the final.

Seeds

Draw

References

External links
 Main draw

Challenger Banque Nationale de Gatineau - Men's Doubles
2019 Men's Doubles